The house at 527 Pine Street, Kingman, Arizona, is listed on the National Register of Historic Places. The house was built in 1917. The home is of the style of the Bungalow/Craftsman. The house was built with native stone. This home was built for Mr. Elliott's nephew. The home was considered an upper class. The nephew was very civic minded. During World War II, the home was used as the Jewish Religious Center for the Jewish Personnel of Kingman Army Air Field.

It was evaluated for National Register listing as part of a 1985 study of 63 historic resources in Kingman that led to this and many others being listed.

References

Houses on the National Register of Historic Places in Arizona
Houses in Kingman, Arizona
Jewish-American history
National Register of Historic Places in Kingman, Arizona
Houses completed in 1917
1917 establishments in Arizona
Jews and Judaism in Arizona